Homecoming (似水流年) is a 1984 Hong Kong film directed by Yim Ho. It won the Best Film Award at the 4th Hong Kong Film Awards. The film was also selected as the Hong Kong entry for the Best Foreign Language Film at the 57th Academy Awards, but was not accepted as a nominee.

Awards and nominations
4th Hong Kong Film Awards
 Won: Best Film
 Won: Best Director - Yim Ho
 Won: Best Actress - Siqin Gaowa
 Won: Best Newcomer - Josephine Koo
 Won: Best Screenplay
 Won: Best Art Direction
 Nominated: Best Actress
 Nominated: Best Cinematography
 Nominated: Best Editing
 Nominated: Best Music - Kitarō
 Nominated: Best Song -  Anita Mui (singer), Kitarō (composer), Zeng Gwok-gong (lyricist)

See also
 List of submissions to the 57th Academy Awards for Best Foreign Language Film
 List of Hong Kong submissions for the Academy Award for Best Foreign Language Film

References

External links

 

1984 films
Best Film HKFA
Hong Kong drama films
Films directed by Yim Ho
1980s Hong Kong films